The International Convention Center (Merkaz HaKongresim HaBeinLeumi), commonly known as Binyenei HaUma (lit. Buildings of the nation), is a concert hall and convention center in Giv'at Ram in Jerusalem. It is the largest convention center in the Middle East.

History
Binyenei Ha'Uma was first envisioned by Alexander Ezer (who later became its managing director) and planned by architect Zeev Rechter who won the design competition in 1949.

The complex was under construction from 1950 to 1963. In 1953, it was the site of Israel's first international exhibition, the Conquest of the Desert. In 1960, the World Zionist Organization convened there.

The period of economic difficulty and austerity in the first decade of Israeli independence led to frequent disruption in construction due to lack of funds, and the project was sometimes disparagingly called Hirbet HaUma, the National Ruin. Rechter's design was a solid structure faced in Jerusalem stone. Instead of a monumental relief by artists Joseph Zaritsky and Yitzhak Danziger as originally planned, the facade was covered with azure-coloured glass panels.

Capacity and functions
Located opposite the Jerusalem Central Bus Station at the western entrance to town, the centre houses 27 halls capable of seating over 10,000 people, and is a member of the AIPC and ICCA and conforms to their international standards. Its largest hall, the Menachem Ussishkin auditorium, seats 3,104. In all, 12,000 square metres of exhibit space extend over two levels and ten display areas.

Binyenei Ha'Uma is the home of the Jerusalem Symphony Orchestra. The complex has hosted many international events, among them the Eurovision Song Contest 1979, Eurovision Song Contest 1999 and the Jerusalem International Book Fair. The trial of John Demjanjuk was held there.

Development plans
Plans are being discussed to enlarge the ICC by 30,000 square meters, doubling of the parking space, adding three office towers, commercial space and a hotel.

Cultural references
The Center serves as a historical setting in Robert J. Sawyer's 1997 novel Frameshift. It serves as a post-World War II venue for a war crimes trial, in which a Nazi camp guard is prosecuted for atrocities against the Jewish prisoners.

Gallery

See also
Architecture in Israel

References

External links

 International Convention Center (Jerusalem) official website
 Jewish Agency for Israel (owner)

1950 establishments in Israel
Buildings and structures completed in 1963
Buildings and structures in Jerusalem
Concert halls in Israel
Economy of Jerusalem
Convention centers in Israel
Jewish Agency for Israel